Anaïs Duplan (born 1992) is a Haitian writer now based in the U.S., with three book publications from Action Books, Black Ocean Press, and Brooklyn Arts Press, respectively. His work has been honored by a Whiting Award and a Marian Goodman fellowship from Independent Curators International, and he is queer and trans.

Early life and education 
Duplan was born in Jacmel, Haiti. He moved to the United States as a child and grew up in Boston and Brooklyn with his mother. His writing about his father's absence from his childhood and how it impacted his understanding of gender norms was published in The Paris Review, and he discussed his parents' impact on his work in an interview with The Rumpus. He also lived in Cuba for several years. Eventually, after attending Rhode Island School of Design, Duplan graduated from Bennington College in 2014 and then the Iowa Writers' Workshop in 2017.

Career 
Duplan's poetry publications include the book Take This Stallion, published in 2016 by Brooklyn Arts Press, which Publishers Weekly wrote in a review "tactfully manages to stir the comical and casual into poems about pain, crippling emotional uncertainty, substance abuse, and death," and I NEED MUSIC, published in 2021 by Action Books. The latter received praise from poets Jericho Brown, Major Jackson, and Shane McCrae, as well as positive reviews from Literary Hub and Make. In June 2021, Duplan was the guest editor for the Academy of American Poets's Poem-a-Day series.

Duplan's first nonfiction book, Blackspace: On the Poetics of an Afrofuture, was published by Black Ocean Press in 2020 after excerpts were published in Ploughshares and Hyperallergic. The nonfiction book discusses the meanings of transition and passing in regard to gender, including the irreversible effects of testosterone therapy. Claudia Rankine listed it as a book she looked forward to reading in an interview with The New York Times, Hanif Abdurraqib called it "futuristic work," and a review in Colorado Review noted that its style is "as much theoretical as it is journalistic as it is in the style of manifesto." In 2022, he received a Whiting Award for nonfiction, which NPR noted was a predictor of writers who would go onto become "household names." Vanity Fair noted Duplan's outfit at the award reception as a "spectacular jumpsuit."

In 2016, Duplan founded the Center for Afrofuturist Studies, an artist residency program developed to give artists of color arts space after a fundraiser on Kickstarter. The first artists-in-residence while Duplan served as director were Yulan Grant, Terrence Nance, Krista Franklin. In 2021, the center started new collaborations with Iowa City, including murals, interviews, and performances. While at Iowa, Duplan met Tracie Morris, when they "both presented talks at Columbia University’s More Than A Manifesto conference" and she later interviewed him about black sociality, academia, and influences for The Los Angeles Review of Books. Duplan was also interviewed for the New York City Trans Oral History Project, in conjunction with New York Public Library's oral history project. He has been teaching at Bennington College, his alma mater, since 2021.

References 

Living people
21st-century Haitian writers
Haitian male writers
American curators
Bennington College alumni
Haitian expatriates in Cuba
Haitian emigrants to the United States
People from Jacmel
Transgender writers
Iowa Writers' Workshop alumni
Queer writers
21st-century American male writers
21st-century American poets
Writers from Brooklyn
Writers from Boston
American male non-fiction writers
21st-century American non-fiction writers
American male poets
Haitian LGBT people
1992 births